Laura Glen Louis is an American author, poet, and essayist. Her work has appeared in Ploughshares, Michigan Quarterly Review, Columbia Poetry Review, AGNI Online, American Short Fiction, and Nimrod, and has been anthologized in Best American Short Stories. Her collection, Talking in the Dark (Harcourt, 2001) a Barnes & Noble Discover book, and San Francisco Chronicle Bestseller, was named by Detroit Free Press as one of the eight best books of 2001. Born in Macao, Louis graduated from the University of California, Berkeley. She lives in California.

Bibliography
Talking in the Dark, Harcourt, Inc. 2001 ,  ppb 
Some, like elephants, El León Literary Arts, 2010

Anthologies
Best American Short Stories, 1994 Tobias Wolff and Katrina Kennison, editors

Awards and honors
Barnes & Noble Discover book, Talking in the Dark, 2001
Katherine Anne Porter Prize, Nimrod Literary Journal 1990

External links
New York Times Review
Boston Review review
Publishers Weekly review
Chicago Tribune review
Newsday review
El Leon Literary Arts
Homepage

Living people
American women short story writers
American short story writers
American people of Chinese descent
American essayists
Writers from the San Francisco Bay Area
American women essayists
American women poets
20th-century American women writers
20th-century American poets
Year of birth missing (living people)
21st-century American women